Dadd or Dadds is a surname. Notable people include:

 Hannah Dadds (1941-2011), British train driver
 Ince Gordon Dadds, law firm
 Philip Dadd (1880-1916), British illustrator
 Rachael Dadd, English folk musician
 Richard Dadd (1817-1876), English painter
 Robert Dadds (born 1992), English squash player
 Kristian Quinn Dadds (1784-1814), English poet